Niger South Senatorial District is known as Zone A within Niger State. Bima Muhammad Enagi of the All Progressives Congress, APC is the current representative of Niger South in the Senate. The Niger South Senatorial District covers 8 local government areas which includes:
 Agaie local government area
 Bida local government area
 Edati local government area
 Gbako local government area
 Katcha local government area
 Lapai local government area
 Lavun local government area 
 Mokwa local government area

List of senators representing Niger South

References 

Politics of Niger State
Senatorial districts in Nigeria